John Byner (né John Biener; June 28, 1938) is an American actor, comedian and impressionist who has had a lengthy television and film career. His voice work includes the cartoon series The Ant and the Aardvark, in which the title characters are voiced by Byner's impressions of Dean Martin and Jackie Mason, respectively.

Career
On The Ed Sullivan Show, where he made his first early TV appearances, he mimicked Ed Sullivan among many others. Other impressions included John Wayne and he sings as Dean Martin and Johnny Mathis. His ability to mimic "Toastmaster General" George Jessel came in handy during his appearances on panel programs such as celebrity "roasts" and other tributes.

In 1966, Byner released "Everybody Do The," a musical spoof of dance crazes, as a single on the Pop-Side label. Byner wrote the song with his manager Harry Colomby. The B side of the record was a cover of the blues/R&B/rock standard "Baby, Please Don't Go."

On a 1967 episode of Get Smart, he played a KAOS agent who made a phone call to the Chief of CONTROL (played by Edward Platt), performed a perfect impression of President Lyndon B. Johnson, and told the Chief he was fired and replaced with agent Maxwell Smart (Don Adams).

In 1970-71, he hosted 22 episodes of Something Else, a syndicated half-hour musical variety series. He then hosted his own show in 1972 called the John Byner Comedy Hour, where the character Super Dave Osborne, portrayed by Bob Einstein, was first introduced. That same year, he had a cameo appearance in What's Up, Doc? In the mid-1970s, he guest starred in two episodes of The Odd Couple.  

Byner played a comedian/impersonator aboard a cruise ship in season 6 of Hawaii Five-O. His character, Duffy Malone, did impersonations of John Wayne and then got hit on the back of his head as a diversionary tactic by the bad guy. He had a recurring role in the situation comedy The Practice during its first season in 1976.

In the late 1970s, he had a featured role as Detective Donahue on the TV series Soap. He was cast in Happy Days as Mork from Ork but found the premise ridiculous, so he declined the role days before filming began. Robin Williams was called in at the last minute, and that substitution proved to be a career-making part for Williams.

In the 1970s, Byner appeared several times on The Carol Burnett Show, where in one comedy sketch he wore a Donald Duck costume and mimicked the cartoon character's distinctive voice. He appeared several times on talk shows hosted by David Letterman.

In the 1980s, he hosted Bizarre (produced and filmed in Canada), which re-introduced many people to hapless daredevil Super Dave Osborne played by Bob Einstein. In 1983 he had a role as "Doc," who was Burt Reynolds's longtime childhood friend in the film Stroker Ace. In 1985 The Walt Disney Company's animated feature The Black Cauldron was released, featuring Byner voicing the characters Gurgi and Doli. He was a regular celebrity guest on Hollywood Squares during the John Davidson years and later hosted the 1988-89 syndicated game show Relatively Speaking.  He appeared in an episode of Friday the 13th: The Series as a washed-up ventriloquist.

On May 26, 2017, it was reported that Byner had been cast in a supporting role in the Amazon Video horror anthology series Lore, which is based on the podcast of the same name. Byner portrays Patrick Boland, the father of Bridget Cleary (played by Holland Roden). Lore premiered on October 13, 2017.

In 2020, Byner released his autobiography, Five Minutes, Mr. Byner!, co-written with Douglas Wellman.

Personal life
Byner was born John Biener in New York City on June 28, 1938, the son of Christina, a mental hospital attendant, and Michael Biener, a truck mechanic.

Byner has been married four times, and has four children with his first wife Eleanor Belcher. One of his children, Don (Donny) Byner, strongly resembles his father and appeared for the first time on TV dressed as a leprechaun on Captain's Log with Captain Mark Gray. He has been married to Anne Gaybis since 1992.

Filmography

Film

Television

References

External links
Official website

1938 births
Living people
20th-century American comedians
21st-century American comedians
20th-century American male actors
21st-century American male actors
American game show hosts
American impressionists (entertainers)
American male comedians
American male film actors
American male television actors
American male voice actors
American sketch comedians
Comedians from New York City
Male actors from New York City